Germán Alexis Rolín Fernández (born 7 February 1989) is a Uruguayan footballer who plays as a central defender for Independiente Medellín.

Club career

Club Nacional de Football
Rolín began his football career with Uruguayan club Nacional. He made his first team debut on 8 May 2011 in a 1-0 win over CA Peñarol. During the 2011-12 season, he was outstanding as defender and many clubs showed interest in him. After two consecutive times finishing as the Champions with Nacional, Rolín joined Italian Serie A club Catania.

Calcio Catania
On 22 August 2012, Rolín was officially transferred to Calcio Catania. In his debut Serie A campaign, he has served mostly as a back-up to the likes of Nicola Legrottaglie, Nicolas Spolli, and Giuseppe Bellusci, under head coach, Rolando Maran.

Rolín is currently part of a record-breaking Catania outfit that had picked up 56 points from 38 Serie A matches. This performance also saw the club break its record number of home victories in a single season, its record number of victories overall in a single top flight campaign, as well as its record points total in Serie A for the fifth consecutive season.

Boca Juniors
In January 2015, Rolín officially signed on loan with Argentine club Boca Juniors.

Club Olimpia
On 26 May 2016, it was announced that Rolín had signed for Olimpia.

International career
He was called up by Óscar Tabárez for the Uruguay Olympic football team that played at the 2012 Summer Olympics being held in London, Great Britain.

Honours
Nacional
Uruguayan Primera División (2): 2010–11, 2011–12

Boca Juniors
Argentine Primera División (1): 2015
Copa Argentina (1): 2014–15

References

External links
 

1989 births
Living people
Footballers from Montevideo
Uruguayan footballers
Uruguayan expatriate footballers
Uruguay international footballers
Club Nacional de Football players
Catania S.S.D. players
Club Olimpia footballers
Boca Juniors footballers
Universidad de Concepción footballers
C.A. Rentistas players
Uruguayan Primera División players
Paraguayan Primera División players
Serie A players
Serie B players
Argentine Primera División players
Chilean Primera División players
Footballers at the 2012 Summer Olympics
Olympic footballers of Uruguay
Association football central defenders
Expatriate footballers in Argentina
Expatriate footballers in Chile
Expatriate footballers in Italy
Expatriate footballers in Paraguay
Uruguayan expatriate sportspeople in Argentina
Uruguayan expatriate sportspeople in Chile
Uruguayan expatriate sportspeople in Italy
Uruguayan expatriate sportspeople in Paraguay